Ligny-en-Cambrésis is a commune in the Nord department in northern France. The first Australian soldier to fall during the First World War, lieutnant William Malcolm Chisholm, who died of his wounds on 27 August 1914, is buried at Ligny-en-Cambrésis Communal Cemetery.

Heraldry

Population

See also
Communes of the Nord department

References

Lignyencambresis